Joseph ben Abraham Gikatilla (1248 – after 1305) ("the very little one") was a Spanish kabbalist, student of Abraham Abulafia.

Biography
Born at Medinaceli, Old Castile, Gikatilla was for some time a pupil of the kabbalist Abraham Abulafia, by whom he is highly praised; his kabbalistic knowledge became so profound that he was supposed to be able to work miracles, and on this account was called "Joseph Ba'al ha-Nissim".. (the Thaumaturge or literally Master of Miracles; Zacuto, Yuḥasin, p. 224a). Like his master, Gikatilla occupied himself with mystic combinations and transpositions of letters and numbers; indeed, Abulafia considered him as the continuator of his school (Adolf Jellinek, B.H. iii, p. xl). But Gikatilla was not an adversary of philosophy; on the contrary, he tried to reconcile philosophy with kabbalah, declaring that the latter is the foundation of the former. He, however, strove after the higher science, that is, mysticism. His works in general represent a progressive development of philosophical insight into mysticism. His first work shows that he had considerable knowledge of secular sciences, and that he was familiar with the works of Ibn Gabirol, Ibn Ezra, Maimonides, and others. He died at Peñafiel after 1305.

In different manuscripts of the work the author's name is variously written "Gribzul," "Karnitol," and "Necatil," all corruptions of "Gikatilla."

Works

Ginnat Egoz
Gikatilla was a prolific writer; he wrote his first work (Ginnat Egoz) when only twenty-six.
It is a kabbalistic treatise in three parts (Hanau, 1615).

 The title (from Cant. vi.11). It literally means "garden of nuts,". Kabalisitically, "Ginnat" consisting of the initials of "Gemaṭria," "Noṭariḳon," "Temurah", the three main elements of Kabbala, while "Egoz" (the nut) is the emblem of mysticism.
 The first part, in five chapters, treats of the various names of God occurring in the Bible. According to Gikatilla, "YHVH" is the only name which represents the substance of God; the other names are merely predicates of the divine attributes. "YHVH" stands for God as He is, while "Elohim" denotes God as the creative power. The name "ẓeba'ot" (hosts), he says, applies to all the beings of the three natures, earthly, heavenly (or spheres), and spirits (or forms). The interpretation of "ẓeba'ot" as ("host of letters") leads him over to the second part.
 The second part treats of the letters of the alphabet. He declares that the number ten emanated from YHVH, the primitive cause, and is the source of all being; he attempts to prove his statement by different combinations based on religion, philosophy, physics, and mysticism. He shows that the Talmudic view that space is filled with spirits agrees with the belief of the philosophers that there is no vacuum. He also treats here of the revolutions of the sun and moon, giving the relative sizes of the planets.
 The third part is a treatise, in four chapters, on the vowels. The three primitive vowels, "ḥolem," "shuruḳ," and "ḥiriḳ," represent the upper, middle, and lower worlds; the three compound ones, "ẓere," "segol," and "shewa," represent the composition or the construction of the worlds; the "pataḥ" and "ḳameẓ" represent their movements.

Gikatilla at times criticizes the Sefer Yeẓirah and the Pirḳe Hekalot. The seven heavens (Ḥag. 12a) are identified by him with the seven planets. He holds Maimonides in great esteem even when he opposes him, and quotes him very often. Other authorities quoted by him are Ibn Gabirol, Samuel ibn Naghrela, and Abraham ibn Ezra. Isaac ben Samuel of Acre in his Me'irat 'Enayyim severely criticizes Gikatilla for too free usage of the Holy Name.

Ginnat Egoz has been translated and adapted into English as "HaShem Is One."

Sha'are Orah
Sha'are Orah, or Sefer ha-Orah, is Gikatilla's most influential work. The Arizal call it "a key to understanding the mystical studies". The Vilna Gaon and Zundel Salant recommended that their students study it. Among those who quote it are: Moshe Cordevero, Joseph Caro, Chaim Vital, the Shelah ha-Kadosh, the Sefat Emet, Shem Tov ibn Shem Tov, Moses al-Ashkar, and Judah Hayyat, and long extracts from it are inserted by Reuben ben Hoshke in his Yalḳuṭ Reubeni. It was translated into Latin by Paul Ricius and used by Reuchlin as a defense against his adversaries.

Contents and Style
Sha'are Orah (Mantua, 1561) deals with the names of God. 
 It discusses 300 names, organized into ten chapters, one for each sephirah. Each sephirah has one main name, but may have many others. Some names are associated with more than one sephirah.
 The purpose of the book is "so that you can understand and experience the 'fountain of living waters' (Jer. 2,13) that flows from all his names, and when you attain this 'then you will prosper and have good success' (Joshua 1,8)".

Gikatilla takes an attitude somewhat hostile to philosophy. He quotes only the Sefer Yeẓirah and the Pirḳe Hekalot,.

Other works
 Sha'are Ẓedeḳ, or Sha'ar ha-Shamayim, another treatise by Gikatilla on the ten spheres (Riva, 1561).
 Sefer ha-Niḳḳud, a mystical explanation of the vowel-points, included with the Arze Lebanon (Venice, 1601);
 Sod ha-Ḥashmal, a kabbalistic commentary on the vision of Ezekiel, also printed with the Arze Lebanon;
 Ẓofnat Pa'aneaḥ, commentary on the Pesaḥ Haggadah (ib. 1600 [?]);
 Sodot ha-Miẓwot, a kabbalistic explanation of the commandments;
 Iggeret, kabbalistic essays (Feṙrara, 1556);
 Teshubot, responsa;
 Sha'ar Meshalim, a kabbalistic essay in 138 paragraphs;
 Oẓar ha-Kavod, according to Jellinek, the same as the Sodot ha-Miẓwot, a commentary on Canticles.
Hassagot (unpublished) consists of strictures on the Moreh, (Guide to the Perplexed) Gikatilla used Al-Ḥarizi's translation, in which he corrects many mistakes and sometimes differs from Maimonides. It seems that he wrote the Hassagot in the beginning of his literary career, when he was more of a philosopher and less of a mystic.
 Sod HaNahash, kabbalistic revelations of the divine serpent - link below to first ever English Translation;
https://www.amazon.com/Secret-Serpent-Rab-Yosef-Chiqatiya/dp/B08RZ8FPPF/ref=sr_1_2?crid=1O04KJGRDWQF4&keywords=chief+magician+of+mystery+babylon&qid=1665769223&qu=eyJxc2MiOiIzLjA1IiwicXNhIjoiMi43OSIsInFzcCI6IjIuMzIifQ%3D%3D&sprefix=chief+magician%2Caps%2C103&sr=8-2
 Jellinek thinks that Gikatilla composed a kabbalistic treatise entitled Hekalot of the same character as the Pirḳe Hekalot.

Jewish Encyclopedia bibliography
Adolf Jellinek, Beiträge zur Gesch. der Kabbala, ii.61 et seq.;
Zunz, Additamenta (to the catalogue of the Hebrew manuscripts in Leipzig), pp. 320–321;
Cassel, in Ersch and Gruber, Encyc. section ii, part 31, pp. 76–80;
S. Sachs, in Ha-Yonah, p. 80;
M. H. Landauer, in Litteraturblatt des Orients, vi.227-228;
Eliakim Carmoly, Itinéraires, p. 276;
Heinrich Grätz, Gesch. 3d ed., pp. 194, 198;
Moritz Steinschneider, Cat. Bodl. cols. 1461–1470.

References
 See an adaptation and translation of Ginnat Egoz entitled HaShem Is One, by The Neirot Foundation, 2020.

 Thorough analysis of Gikatilla's thought has been presented in: Elke Morlok "Rabbi Joseph Gikatilla's Hermeneutics", Mohr Siebeck 2010
 See also: Federico Dal Bo, Emanation and Philosophy of Language. An Introduction to Joseph ben Abraham Giqatilla, Los Angeles, Cherub Press, 2019.

Notes

1248 births
14th-century deaths
People from the Province of Soria
13th-century Castilian rabbis
14th-century Castilian rabbis
Sephardi rabbis
Kabbalists